Intars Dambis (born 3 September 1983) is a Latvian bobsledder who has competed since 2002. He won a bronze medal in the four-man event at the FIBT World Championships 2009 in Lake Placid, New York.

Career highlights

World Championships
2005 - Calgary, 24th at 4-bob with Gūts / Dīcmanis / Rozītis
2007 - St. Moritz, 20th at 2-bob with Mihails Arhipovs
2007 - St. Moritz, 18th at 4-bob with Arhipovs / Dīcmanis / Melbārdis
World Cup
2007 - Calgary, 5th at 4-bob with Miņins / Dreiškens / Melbārdis
2007 - Park City, 4th at 4-bob with Miņins / Dreiškens / Melbārdis
2007 - Lake Placid, 9th at 4-bob with Miņins / Dreiškens / Melbārdis
2008 - Cortina d'Ampezzo, 7th at 4-bob with Miņins / Dreiškens / Melbārdis
2008 - Cesana, 1st  at 4-bob with Miņins / Dreiškens / Melbārdis
European Championships
2008 - Cesana, 1st  at 4-bob with Miņins / Dreiškens / Melbārdis

References

External links

 
 
 

1983 births
Latvian male bobsledders
Living people
People from Gulbene